"Woman" is a song by Australian rock band Wolfmother. Originally released in 2004 from their debut EP Wolfmother, it was released in 2006 as the fourth single from their debut studio album Wolfmother.

In Australia, the original recording of the song was ranked number 45 on Triple J's Hottest 100 of 2004.

The song became a massive hit on rock radio during the summer of 2006 in the United States, peaking at number 7 on the Billboard Mainstream Rock Tracks chart and number 10 on the Modern Rock Tracks chart.

In 2007, it won the award for Best Hard Rock Performance at the 49th Annual Grammy Awards.

Content
Singer Andrew Stockdale said the song was inspired both by his girlfriend, and the overall impression of living in Sydney, "this beautiful city in the harbor."

Track listings
All songs written by Andrew Stockdale, Chris Ross and Myles Heskett.
Australian CD
"Woman"
"Woman" (MSTRKRFT Remix)
"Woman" (Avalanches Remix)
"Dimension" (live at Big Day Out)
Australian 7" vinyl
"Woman
"Colossal" (live at Big Day Out)
United Kingdom CD
"Woman"
"Dimension" (live at Big Day Out)
"Vagabond" (acoustic version)
"Woman" (music video)
United Kingdom 7" vinyl
"Woman"
"Woman" (Avalanches Remix)
United Kingdom 12" picture disc
"Woman"
"Woman" (MSTRKRFT Remix)

Charts

Weekly charts

Year-end charts

Certifications

APRA Award
2008 Most Played Australian Work Overseas APRA Award for "Woman", written by Stockdale, Ross and Heskett, was presented by Australasian Performing Right Association.

Uses
"Woman" was featured in the soundtracks of Major League Baseball 2K7, MotorStorm, Madden NFL 07, Tony Hawk's Project 8, Pure, and as a remix in Juiced 2: Hot Import Nights. It is a playable song in Guitar Hero II and on Guitar Hero Smash Hits.

References

2005 songs
2006 singles
APRA Award winners
Grammy Award for Best Hard Rock Performance
Song recordings produced by Dave Sardy
Songs written by Andrew Stockdale
Songs written by Chris Ross
Wolfmother songs